

Lok Sabha

Current constituencies
The Lok Sabha (meaning "House of the People") is the lower house of the Parliament of India. Jammu and Kashmir state elects 6 members and they are directly elected by the state electorates of Jammu and Kashmir. Members are elected for five years. The number of seats, allocated to the state/union territory are determined by the population of the state/union territory.

Keys:  
 

Source: Parliament of India (Lok Sabha)

Rajya Sabha

The Rajya Sabha (meaning the "Council of States") is the upper house of the Parliament of India. Jammu and Kashmir state elects Four members and they are indirectly elected by the state legislators of Jammu and Kashmir. The number of seats allocated to the party, are determined by the number of seats a party possesses during nomination and the party nominates a member to be voted on. Elections within the state legislatures are held using Single transferable vote with proportional representation.

Current members

Source: Parliament of India (Rajya Sabha)

See also
 List of constituencies of the Lok Sabha
 List of constituencies of the Jammu and Kashmir Legislative Assembly

References

Elections in Jammu and Kashmir
Politics of Jammu and Kashmir
Parliamentary constituencies